Billy James Mitchell (born 7 April 2001) is an English footballer who plays for Millwall.

Career
Hailing from Orpington, Mitchell joined his boyhood club Millwall at under-15 level. His father's family originates from Bermondsey and are also Millwall fans, so is his maternal great-grandfather.  He made his first team debut in the last game of the season on 5 May 2019, coming on a late substitute in the 1–0 defeat to Wigan Athletic. In the summer of 2019 he signed his first professional contract, a one-year deal. In April 2021, he signed a new long term deal with Millwall.  He scored his first professional goal in a 4-1 win against Bristol City on 1 May 2021. Mitchell was awarded the PFA Championship Players in the Community award for the 2021–22 season after becoming heavily involved in Millwall's Community Trust.

Career statistics

References

2001 births
Living people
English footballers
Footballers from Orpington
Association football midfielders
Millwall F.C. players
English Football League players